Constituencies in 1868–1885 | 1885 MPs | 1886 MPs | 1892 MPs | 1895 MPs | 1900 MPs | 1906 MPs | January 1910 MPs | December 1910 MPs | Constituencies in 1918–1945

This is a list of all constituencies that were in existence in the 1885, 1886, 1892, 1895, 1900, 1906, January 1910, and December 1910 general elections.

A

B

C

D

E

F

G

H

I

J

K

L

M

N

O

P

R

S

T

U

W

Y

Maps of constituencies

1885-1918
Parliamentary constituencies
Parliamentary constituencies
Parliamentary constituencies
Parliamentary constituencies